Hassan Mohammed Abdul Latif Jameel (born 6 October 1988) is a Saudi businessman and philanthropist. He is Deputy President and Vice Chairman of Saudi Arabia operations of the family-owned international conglomerate business Abdul Latif Jameel, which, among numerous business operations, has distribution rights to Toyota vehicles in Saudi Arabia and other countries. His philanthropy work promotes health and safety, and assists job-seekers and those in need in Saudi Arabia.

Early life and education
Born on 6 October 1988, Hassan is the middle son of Mohammed Abdul Latif Jameel, who has been the chairman and president of the diversified international business Abdul Latif Jameel since 1993. He is the grandson of Abdul Latif Jameel (1909–1993), who founded the eponymous company in 1945 and acquired distribution rights to Toyota vehicles in Saudi Arabia in 1955.

Jameel spent his early school career in Japan. He received a BA in International Economics from Sophia University in Tokyo in 2001. He subsequently obtained an MBA from the London Business School.

Career
In 2004, Jameel trained at the Toyota Motor Corporation in Japan, in their domestic kaizen department.

Following his period at Toyota, he returned to Saudi Arabia to work in the family-owned business Abdul Latif Jameel. The company is a diversified conglomerate consisting of independent businesses that cover automotive distribution, auto parts manufacturing, financial services, renewable energy, environmental services, land and real estate development, logistics, electronics retailing, and media services. It has operations in over a dozen countries in the Middle East, North Africa, Turkey, Asia Pacific, and Europe. It is one of the largest independent distributors of Toyota, Daihatsu, and Lexus vehicles in the world.

Jameel is Deputy President and Vice Chairman of domestic Saudi Arabia operations of Abdul Latif Jameel, with responsibility for operations such as automotive, land and real estate, and machinery.

He is on the Global Advisory Board, previously known as the President's Council, of the University of Tokyo. He is also on the board of directors of Family Business Council-Gulf, the GCC chapter of the global family business organization Family Business Network.

Philanthropy
Jameel is President of Community Jameel in Saudi Arabia, a consortium of Abdul Latif Jameel philanthropies formerly known as Abdul Latif Jameel Community Initiatives and founded in 2003. The nonprofit organization has a wide range of social and economic initiatives, including refugee education, job creation, poverty alleviation, food and water security, healthcare improvement, and education and training that supports students beyond the classroom. It also invests in businesses aimed at helping communities transform themselves. Community Jameel also supports artists showcasing their work, and promotes arts and culture. It partners with MIT on global challenges such as health treatment, water and food safety, education for refugees, and poverty elimination, and launched the Abdul Latif Jameel Poverty Action Lab in 2003. Bab Rizq Jameel Saudi Arabia, a division of Community Jameel, creates job opportunities for, and offers guidance to, young Saudi men and women, and also offers interest-free microfinance loans for entrepreneurship and job creation. Jameel is particularly involved in Community Jameel's road safety initiative, which promotes safe driving through education and awareness campaigns.

He is also involved in humanitarian programs with the United Nations High Commissioner for Refugees.

Personal life
In 2012 Jameel married Tunisian art critic, art curator, and Sotheby's international contemporary art specialist Lina Lazaar. An activist promoter of Middle Eastern art, she founded Jeddah Art Week and co-founded Ibraaz. The marriage ended in divorce in 2017.

He was in a relationship with Rihanna from 2017 to 2020. Prior to that he was briefly linked to Naomi Campbell.

Jameel is fluent in Arabic, English, and Japanese. He is an art collector and a keen supporter of the arts.

References

External links
Official site

Saudi Arabian businesspeople
Sophia University alumni
Alumni of London Business School
Living people
Year of birth missing (living people)